The SARP Honorary Award (Polish: Honorowa Nagroda SARP)  is one of the two most prominent and significant annual architectural prizes in Poland, and it's awarded by the Association of Polish Architects (SARP) in recognition of the outstanding lifetime achievements in the field of architecture. It has been acclaimed 'the most prestigious architecture award' by Polish daily Gazeta Wyborcza and by Art & business: gazeta aukcyjna.

It was founded in 1966 and, since then, awarded to a number of Poland's best contemporary architects, amongst them: Marek Budzyński, Stanisław Niemczyk, Ryszard Jurkowski, Stefan Kuryłowicz and Maciej Miłobędzki.

Laureates

1966-1980

1981-2000

2001-present

Photo Gallery

References

Architecture in Poland
Polish awards
Architecture awards
Awards established in 1966
1966 establishments in Poland